Clogmia is a genus of drain flies in the subfamily Psychodinae.

Species
Clogmia albipunctata (Williston, 1893)
Clogmia bidentata Ježek, 2004
Clogmia caboverdeana (Ježek & Harten, 1996)
Clogmia fuscipennis (Tonnoir, 1920)
Clogmia poncianicola (Satchell, 1953)

References

Psychodidae
Psychodomorpha genera
Taxa named by Günther Enderlein